Les mutinés de l'Elseneur is a 1936 French action film directed by Pierre Chenal and starring Jean Murat, Winna Winifried and André Berley. A journalist takes command of a ship after the crew mutiny against the brutal captain. It was an adaptation of the 1914 novel The Mutiny of the Elsinore by Jack London.

En toile de fond servi la barque allemand quatre-mâts Padua; capitaine du voilier était Robert Clauss, le quatre-mâts-barque aujourd'hui comme un navire école Krusenstern sous le drapeau russe.

Partial cast
 Jean Murat - Jack Pathurst 
 Winna Winifried - Winna West 
 André Berley - Le lieutenant Pike 
 Maurice Lagrenée - Bert Rhine 
 Jacques Berlioz - Le capitaine West 
 Raymond Aimos - Un marin 
 Louis Gouget - Sundry Buyers 
  - Larry 
  - Murphy

References

External links

1936 films
1930s action films
1930s French-language films
Films directed by Pierre Chenal
Films based on American novels
Films based on works by Jack London
Films with screenplays by Marcel Aymé
Seafaring films
French black-and-white films
French action films
1930s French films